Roar Hagen (born 15 April 1954) is a Norwegian illustrator.

Biography
He was born in Ørsta, and started his newspaper career in Sunnmørsposten in 1975. He went on to Stavanger Aftenblad from 1978 to 1986 and Verdens Gang since 1986. Through his connection to the Cartoonists & Writers Syndicate in New York City he has been published in Die Zeit, International Herald Tribune, Der Spiegel, Newsweek, Time Magazine and the like. He won the Editorial Cartoon of the Year award in 1997. He has also illustrated books.

He is the father of actor Pål Sverre Valheim Hagen.

References

1954 births
Living people
Norwegian illustrators
Norwegian editorial cartoonists
People from Møre og Romsdal
People from Ørsta